The Very Best of Poco is a 1999 compilation album of songs by the band Poco.

Track listing
"Pickin' Up the Pieces" (Richie Furay) – 3:20
"My Kind Of Love" (Richie Furay) – 2:42
"You Better Think Twice" (Jim Messina) – 3:21
"Anyway Bye Bye" (Richie Furay) – 7:01
"C'mon [Live]" (Richie Furay) – 3:10
"Just In Case It Happens, Yes Indeed / Grand Junction / Consequently So Long [Live]" (Richie Furay/Rusty Young/Skip Goodwin) – 9:46
"Kind Woman" (Richie Furay) – 6:07
"Bad Weather" (Paul Cotton) – 5:02
"Just For Me And You" (Richie Furay) – 3:37
"You Are The One" (Richie Furay) – 3:48
"A Good Feelin' To Know" (Richie Furay) – 5:15
"Go And Say Goodbye" (Stephen Stills) – 2:46
"Faith In The Families" (Paul Cotton) – 3:43
"Whatever Happened To Your Smile" (Timothy B. Schmit) – 3:14

Personnel
Jim Messina - guitar, vocals
Richie Furay - guitar, 12-string guitar, vocals
Rusty Young - steel guitar, banjo, dobro, guitar, piano
Randy Meisner - bass, guitar, vocals
George Grantham - drums, vocals
Timothy B. Schmit - bass, vocals
Paul Cotton - guitar, vocals

Poco compilation albums
1999 greatest hits albums